Phyllis Ann Long (born 1936), is a female former diver who competed for England.

Diving career
Long's first experience of an Olympics was as a 12 year old who travelled with a friend to Wembley and sneaked in to watch the diving final of the 1948 Summer Olympics. Four years later Long was competing in Helsinki at the 1952 Summer Olympics, she reached the final in the 3 metre springboard and finished in eighth place, this was followed up with a fifth place in the 10 metre platform. At the 1956 Summer Olympics she again reach the final in both events, finishing sixth 3 metre springboard, and seventh in the 10 metre platform. Long's third and final Olympic appearance was at the 1960 Summer Olympics and for the third time she reached both finals, finishing 8th in the 10 metre platform and 7th in the 3 metre springboard.

She represented England and won a gold medal and bronze medal in the 3 metres springboard and 10 metres platform respectively at the 1954 British Empire and Commonwealth Games in Vancouver, Canada. Four years later she won a silver medal in the 10 metres platform at the 1958 British Empire and Commonwealth Games in Cardiff.

Personal life
After her diving days were finished Long married Ron Pearce and they had seven children, she became a primary school teacher and also introduced children to diving in her local pool, and when in her seventies she still owned a pub which is run by one of her daughters.

References

1936 births
English female divers
Commonwealth Games medallists in diving
Commonwealth Games gold medallists for England
Commonwealth Games silver medallists for England
Commonwealth Games bronze medallists for England
Olympic divers of Great Britain
Divers at the 1952 Summer Olympics
Divers at the 1956 Summer Olympics
Divers at the 1960 Summer Olympics
Living people
Divers at the 1954 British Empire and Commonwealth Games
Divers at the 1958 British Empire and Commonwealth Games
Medallists at the 1954 British Empire and Commonwealth Games
Medallists at the 1958 British Empire and Commonwealth Games